Shaukat Ali (born 1976) is a Pakistani politician who was a member of the National Assembly of Pakistan from 2018 to 2022.

Political career
Ali was elected to the National Assembly in 2018 as a member of Pakistan Tehreek-e-Insaf (PTI). He received 87,895 votes and defeated the incumbent assemblyman, Ghulam Ahmad Bilour.

On 10 April 2022, after Prime Minister Imran Khan lost a vote of no-confidence in the Pakistani parliament, Ali resigned from the assembly on Khan's orders. The new government did not initially accept the resignations of several departing members for fear of reducing the number of members. However, it accepted the resignations of eleven, including Ali, on July 28. Later, by-elections were held again for Ali's seat. Khan made a surprising move to stand on his own in all of the by-election seats.

See also
 List of members of the 15th National Assembly of Pakistan

References

External links
 

Living people
Pakistani MNAs 2018–2023
1976 births